The George Ward Technology College was a medium-sized comprehensive school in Melksham, Wiltshire, England between 1953 and 2010. A maintained co-educational secondary school, it catered for pupils aged 11 to 18. Wiltshire County Council was the Local Authority for the school.

The school's last Ofsted report, publish in February 2010, assessed the school as "inadequate", "performing significantly less well than in all the circumstances it could reasonably be expected to perform." The school was subsequently given a notice to improve.

.

History
The school opened in September 1953 as Shurnhold School with accommodation for 800 pupils, on the northwest outskirts of Melksham, on the road to Shaw. It was the first post-war secondary school in Wiltshire.

Shurnhold was a secondary modern school and its name changed to George Ward School on its transition to a comprehensive school. The school was named after Alderman George Ward, JP who served as the first Chairman of Governors from the opening of the school until he died in February 1969.

In 2006 the George Ward School was selected for replacement by a new school under the Building Schools for the Future programme. It was replaced by Melksham Oak School which  opened on a new site, southeast of the town, in June 2010. The George Ward site was sold for a housing development named George Ward Gardens.

References

Educational institutions established in 1953
Defunct schools in Wiltshire
1953 establishments in England
Educational institutions disestablished in 2009
2009 disestablishments in England
Melksham